In computational modelling, multiphysics simulation (often shortened to simply "multiphysics") is defined as the simultaneous simulation of different aspects of a physical system or systems and the interactions among them. For example, simultaneous simulation of the physical stress on an object, the temperature distribution of the object and the thermal expansion which leads to the variation of the stress and temperature distributions would be considered a multiphysics simulation. Multiphysics simulation is related to multiscale simulation, which is the simultaneous simulation of a single process on either multiple time or distance scales.

As an interdisciplinary field, multiphysics simulation can span many science and engineering disciplines. Simulation methods frequently include numerical analysis,  partial differential equations and tensor analysis.

Multiphysics simulation process 
The implementation of a multiphysics simulation follows a typical series of steps:

 Identify the aspects of the system to be simulated, including physical processes, starting conditions, and the coupling or boundary conditions among these process.
 Create a discrete mathematical model of the system.
 Numerically solve the model.
 Process the resulting data.

Mathematical models 

Mathematical models used in multiphysics simulations are generally a set of coupled equations. The equations can be divided into three categories according to the nature and intended role: governing equation, auxiliary equations and boundary/initial conditions. A governing equation describes a major physical mechanisms or process. Multiphysics simulations are numerically implemented with discretization methods such as the finite element method, finite difference method, or finite volume method.

Challenges of multiphysics simulation 
Generally speaking, multiphysics simulation is much harder than that for individual aspects of the physical processes.
The main extra issue is how to integrate the multiple aspects of the processes with proper handling of the interactions among them.
Such issue becomes quite difficult when different types numerical methods are used for the simulations of individual physical aspects. 
For example, when simulating a fluid-structure interaction problem with typical Eulerian finite volume method for flow 
and Lagrangian finite element method for structure dynamics.

See also
 Finite difference time-domain method

References

 Susan L. Graham, Marc Snir, and Cynthia A. Patterson (Editors), Getting Up to Speed: The Future of Supercomputing, Appendix D. The National Academies Press, Washington DC, 2004. .
 Paul Lethbridge, Multiphysics Analysis, p26, The Industrial Physicist, Dec 2004/Jan 2005, Archived at: 

Numerical analysis
Computational physics